Senna Feron (born 26 October 1995) is a Dutch racing cyclist, who currently rides for Dutch amateur team Watersley Race & Development Team.

References

External links

1995 births
Living people
Dutch female cyclists
Place of birth missing (living people)
21st-century Dutch women